Busiris or Aphroditopolis was an ancient city of Middle Egypt, in the Aphroditopolite nome, on the west bank of the Nile, southwest of Aphroditopolis (the modern city of Atfih).

Location
Aphroditopolis is located 38 miles upstream from Cairo, near the ruins of Memphis, Egypt. All that remains of the city is mounds and ruins, which were excavated by Matthew Flinders Petrie.

History
The city was known as Tpyhwt during pharaonic times, Βούσιρις (Busiris) in Hellenistic times, Aphroditopolis during the Byzantine and Roman Empires, Petpeh in Coptic, and since the Islamic conquest as Atfih.

Under the Ptolemaic dynasty was the seat of the Aphroditopolis Nome and under the Romans was also seat of former bishopric, in Roman province Arcadia Aegypti.
Known bishops include:
 Chysaorius of Aphroditopolis
 Issac of Aphroditopolis fl.1183 (Latin)
 Jacob, Bishop of Aphroditopolis fl.1020s
 Father Zosima el-Antony(Orthodox)
It remains today a vacant titular see.

References

Richard Talbert, Barrington Atlas of the Greek and Roman World,, p. 75.

Cities in ancient Egypt
Former populated places in Egypt